Gruffydd Davies (c. 1517 – 1583 or later) was the member of the Parliament of England for the constituency of Caernarfon (Wales) for the parliament of March 1553.

References 

English MPs 1553 (Edward VI)
Members of the Parliament of England for Caernarfon
1510s births
1580s deaths
Year of birth uncertain
Year of death uncertain